The following table lists the 60 highest United States county or county-equivalent high points. The highest U.S. county high point is the summit of Denali in the Denali Borough of Alaska, the highest summit of the United States and all of North America. Of these 60 highest county high points, 32 are located in Colorado, seven in California, six each in Alaska and Wyoming, three in New Mexico, two each in Utah and Nevada, and one each in Washington and Hawaii. Use the OpenStreetMap link below to view the location of these county high points.


Highest U.S. county high points

Gallery

See also

Lists of highest points
List of highest points in California by county
List of Colorado county high points
List of highest points in Oregon by county
List of highest points in Nevada by county
List of highest points in Washington by county
List of mountain peaks of the United States

Notes

References

External links

National Geodetic Survey
Finding Survey Marks and Datasheets
United States Geological Survey
National Map Search
Elevation Point Query Service

Lists of counties of the United States
Counties of the United States
County high points, List of highest United States
United States county high points, List of highest
United States county high points, List of highest